Markus Gröger (born 30 May 1991) is a German former footballer who played as a defender.

Career
Gröger made his professional debut for Hansa Rostock in the 3. Liga on 23 August 2014, coming on as a substitute in the 80th minute for Robin Krauße in the 4–4 away draw against Jahn Regensburg.

References

External links
 Profile at DFB.de
 

1991 births
Living people
Footballers from Berlin
German footballers
Association football defenders
Eintracht Frankfurt II players
FC Hansa Rostock players
Borussia Fulda players
3. Liga players
Regionalliga players
Oberliga (football) players